Apache Junction (Western Apache: Hagosgeed) is a city in Pinal and Maricopa counties in the state of Arizona. As of the 2020 census, the population was 38,499, most of whom lived in Pinal County. It is named for the junction of the Apache Trail and Old West Highway. The area where Apache Junction is located used to be known as Youngberg. Superstition Mountain, the westernmost peak of the Superstition Mountains, is to the east.

History
Apache Junction arose at an intersection on an unpaved stagecoach trail to the nearby Superstition Mountains. The location became a historical landmark, part of a scenic byway that was opened to the public in 1922 and is currently part of a  "circle trail" that begins and ends in Apache Junction. The O'odham Jeweḍ, Akimel O'odham (Upper Pima), and Hohokam people all have tribal ties to the area.

Geography
A small portion of the city limits comprising the El Dorado Mobile Estates Resort and Senior Cottages of Apache Junction extends west into Maricopa County. The city is bordered to the west partly by the city of Mesa and to the southeast by unincorporated Gold Canyon. Arizona State Route 88, following the route of the old Apache Trail, leads northeast from Apache Junction through the Superstition Mountains  to State Route 188 at Theodore Roosevelt Lake.

Apache Junction is located in the east part of the Phoenix-Mesa-Chandler Metropolitan Area.

The town is bounded to the east by the Superstition Mountains (a federal wilderness area and home of the Lost Dutchman's Gold Mine) and to the north by the Goldfield Mountains with the Bulldog Recreation Area. Goldfield Ghost Town, a tourist location preserved from former prospecting days, lies near the western face of Superstition Mountain just off Highway 88 (Apache Trail). It is located just southwest of the site of the ghost town of Goldfield.

In October 2021, Apache Junction annexed ten square miles south of the city's previous southern boundary.

Demographics

Apache Junction first appeared on the 1970 U.S. Census as an unincorporated village. It formally incorporated as a city in 1978.

As of the census of 2010, there were 35,840 people, 15,574 households, and 9,372 families residing in the city. The racial makeup of the city was 89.5% White, 1.2% Black or African American, 1.1% Native American, 0.8% Asian, 0.1% Pacific Islander, 4.9% from other races, and 2.4% from two or more races. Hispanic or Latino of any race were 14.4% of the population.

There were 15,574 households, out of which 19.6% had children under the age of 18 living with them, 44.6% were married couples living together, 10.7% had a female householder with no husband present, and 39.8% were non-families. 31.4% of all households were made up of individuals, and 15.8% had someone living alone who was 65 years of age or older. The average household size was 2.28 and the average family size was 2.85.

In the city, the population had 19.9% under the age of 20, 4.5% from 20 to 24, 20.4% from 25 to 44, 27.1% from 45 to 64, and 26.2% who were 65 years of age or older. The median age was 47.5 years.

The median income (as of the 2000 census) for a household in the city was $33,170, and the median income for a family was $37,726. Males had a median income of $31,283 versus $22,836 for females. The per capita income for the city was $16,806. About 7.3% of families and 11.6% of the population were below the poverty line, including 18.4% of those under age 18 and 7.4% of those age 65 or over.

Government 
Apache Junction was incorporated as a city on November 24, 1978. The city is governed by a collection of elected officials, clerk, and nine boards and commissions. The city council has seven members, which includes the mayor and vice-mayor. The mayor serves a two-year term. The current mayor is Chip Wilson, Vice Mayor Christa Rizzi.

Historic structures
This gallery includes images of some of the remaining historical structures located in Apache Junction. Among the exhibits on the grounds of the Superstition Mountain Museum are studio sets and other Western paraphernalia that were saved from the Apacheland fire of 1969. Apacheland was a 1,800-acre movie set which opened in 1960. Also located in Apache junction  is the ghost town of Goldfield. Goldfield was a mining town established in 1893 next to the Superstition Mountain. When the mine vein faulted, the grade of ore dropped and the town eventually became a ghost town. The town and its historic buildings were revived as a tourist attraction.

Transportation
Apache Junction is located along U.S. Route 60.

Apache Junction is not served by local buses. Greyhound Lines serves Apache Junction on its Phoenix-El Paso via Globe route.

See also
Apache Wells, Arizona

References

External links

 

Cities in Arizona
Cities in Pinal County, Arizona
Cities in Maricopa County, Arizona
Arizona placenames of Native American origin
Phoenix metropolitan area
Populated places in the Sonoran Desert
Mining communities in Arizona